Mike Elgin (born October 15, 1983 in Bankston, Iowa) is a former American football offensive lineman. He was drafted by the New England Patriots in the seventh round of the 2007 NFL Draft. He played college football at Iowa.

Elgin has also been a member of the New York Jets and Indianapolis Colts.

Early years
He attended Western Dubuque High School in Epworth, Iowa.

Professional career
Elgin was released on September 1. He was then signed to the Jets' practice squad after clearing waivers. Elgin was released from the Jets on October 4, 2007. He was signed to the Colts' practice squad on November 15.

External links
Indianapolis Colts biography
Iowa Hawkeyes biography
New England Patriots biography

1983 births
Living people
People from Dubuque County, Iowa
American football offensive guards
American football centers
Iowa Hawkeyes football players
New England Patriots players
New York Jets players
Indianapolis Colts players
People from Epworth, Iowa